Çakmak railway station is a railway station in the village of Çakmak, Konya in Turkey. The station consists of a narrow island platform serving two tracks, with four more tracks used as a siding.

TCDD Taşımacılık operates a daily intercity train, the Taurus Express from Konya to Adana.

References

External links
TCDD Taşımacılık
Passenger trains
Çakmak station timetable

Railway stations in Karaman Province